The Subprefecture of Aricanduva is one of 32 subprefectures of the city of São Paulo, Brazil. It comprises three districts: Aricanduva, Carrão, and Vila Formosa. The largest graveyard and the largest shopping mall of the city, Centro Comercial Aricanduva, are located in this region.

See also 
 Roman Catholic Archdiocese of São Paulo

References

External links
 Subprefecture of Aricanduva
 Roman Catholic Archdiocese of São Paulo

Subprefectures of São Paulo